Rybníky is a municipality and village in Příbram District in the Central Bohemian Region of the Czech Republic. It has about 500 inhabitants.

Administrative parts
Villages of Budín and Libice are administrative parts of Rybníky.

References

Villages in Příbram District